The CSWF Hardcore Championship was a professional wrestling hardcore heavyweight championship in the CyberSpace Wrestling Federation. It was among the first original titles of the CyberSpace Wrestling Federation promotion. The inaugural champion was JD Dreamer, who defeated Big Q and Lucifer Grimm in a three-way match on October 19, 2002 to become the first CSWF Hardcore Champion. Dreamer was the only recognized champion and the title was retired when was appointed the promotion's Director of Authority by CSWF Commissioner Larry Zbyszko on February 21, 2003.

Title history

Names

Reigns

List of combined reigns

Footnotes

References

External links
NWA Shockwave on Myspace
NWA Cyberspace on Myspace
CSWF.com
CSWOL.com

NWA Shockwave championships
Hardcore wrestling championships
National Wrestling Alliance championships